Ayala is a Hebrew female given name meaning 'gazelle', 'doe' or 'hind'. 

It is linguistically unrelated to the Spanish surname Ayala, which is of Basque origin.

Given name 

Florian-Ayala Fauna, American artist, musician, music producer
Ayala Hakim, director of the technology division of Mizrahi-Tefahot Bank, Israel, previously Brigadier-general of the Israeli Defence Forces
Ayala Hetzroni (born 1938), Israeli Olympic shotputter
Ayala Ingedashet (born 1978), Ethiopian singer
Ayala Procaccia (born 1941), Israeli judge
Ayala Truelove (born 1975), Israeli football player
Ayala Zacks-Abramov (1912–2011), Israeli art collector

See also
Ayala (disambiguation)

Hebrew feminine given names